Bronte High School is a public high school located in Bronte, Texas (USA) and classified as a 1A school by the UIL. It is part of the Bronte Independent School District located in northeastern Coke County. In 2015, the school was rated "Met Standard" by the Texas Education Agency.

Athletics

The Bronte Longhorns compete in the following sports

Basketball
Football
Golf
Tennis
Track and Field
Volleyball

State Titles
Boys' Golf
1969(B), 1975(B)
Volleyball
1976(B), 1981(1A), 1984(1A), 1987(1A), 1991(1A)

References

External links
Bronte ISD

Schools in Coke County, Texas
Public high schools in Texas